|}

The Prix Djebel is a Group 3 flat horse race in France open to three-year-old thoroughbred colts and geldings. It is run over a distance of 1,400 metres (about 7 furlongs) at Maisons-Laffitte in April.

History
The event is named after Djebel, a successful French racehorse in the early 1940s. It was established in 1949, and the first running was won by Amour Drake.

For a period the Prix Djebel held Listed status. It was promoted to Group 3 level in 2010. It is currently staged on the same day as the Prix Imprudence, the equivalent race for fillies.

The Prix Djebel can serve as a trial for various colts' Classics in Europe. The last winner to achieve victory in the Poule d'Essai des Poulains was Style Vendome in 2013. The last to win the 2,000 Guineas was Makfi in 2010.

Records
Leading jockey since 1979 (6 wins):
 Olivier Peslier – Fantastic Fellow (1997), Berkoutchi (1999), Massalani (2002), Surfrider (2011), French Fifteen (2012), Charm Spirit (2014)

Leading trainer since 1979 (7 wins):
 François Boutin – Nureyev (1980), Zino (1982), L'Emigrant (1983), Machiavellian (1990), Ganges (1991), Kingmambo (1993), Psychobabble (1994)

Leading owner since 1979 (6 wins):
 Stavros Niarchos – Nureyev (1980), L'Emigrant (1983), Machiavellian (1990), Kingmambo (1993), Psychobabble (1994), Byzantium (1996)

Winners since 1979

 .

Earlier winners

 1949: Amour Drake
 1950: Ensorceleur
 1952: Guersant
 1954: Damelot
 1955: Beau Prince
 1956: Philius
 1957: Chronos
 1958: Val d'Oisans
 1959: Taboun
 1960: Venture
 1961: L'Epinay
 1962: Prince Altana
 1963: Aigle Gris
 1964: Takawalk
 1965: The Marshal
 1966: Kashmir
 1967: Astec
 1968: Sun Sun
 1969: Don II
 1970: Roi Soleil
 1972: Big Bead
 1973: Targowice
 1974: Northern Taste
 1976: Vitiges
 1977: Hasty Reply
 1978: Solanum

See also
 List of French flat horse races

References

 France Galop / Racing Post:
 france-galop.com – A Brief History: Prix Djebel.
 galopp-sieger.de – Prix Djebel.
 horseracingintfed.com – International Federation of Horseracing Authorities – Prix Djebel (2019).
 pedigreequery.com – Prix Djebel – Maisons-Laffitte.

Flat horse races for three-year-olds
Maisons-Laffitte Racecourse
Horse races in France
1949 establishments in France
Recurring sporting events established in 1949